Vampire in Brooklyn is a 1995 American vampire black comedy film  directed by Wes Craven. It stars Eddie Murphy, who produced and wrote with his brothers Vernon Lynch and Charles Q. Murphy. The film co-stars Angela Bassett, Allen Payne, Kadeem Hardison, John Witherspoon, Zakes Mokae, and Joanna Cassidy. Murphy also plays an alcoholic preacher, Pauly, and a foul-mouthed Italian-American mobster, Guido, respectively.

Vampire in Brooklyn was the final film produced under Eddie Murphy's exclusive contract with Paramount Pictures, which began with 48 Hrs. (1982) and included the Beverly Hills Cop franchise (1984–1994).

Vampire in Brooklyn was released theatrically in the United States on October 27, 1995. It received mostly negative reviews from critics and failed to meet the studio's expectations, as it was unsuccessful at the box office. Despite this, Vampire In Brooklyn has become regarded as a cult classic and has been subject to critical re-evaluation especially towards Craven’s direction, Murphy and Bassett’s performances and chemistry and the humor.

Plot
An abandoned ship crashes into a dockyard in Brooklyn, New York, and the ship inspector, Silas Green, finds it full of corpses. Elsewhere, Julius Jones, Silas's nephew, has a run-in with some Italian-American mobsters. Just as the two goons are about to kill Julius, Maximillian, a vampire who arrived on the ship, intervenes and kills them. Max infects Julius with his vampiric blood, thereby turning Julius into a decaying ghoul, and explains that he has come to Brooklyn in search of the Dhampir daughter of a vampire from his native Caribbean island in order to live beyond the night of the next full moon.

This Dhampir turns out to be NYPD Detective Rita Veder, still dealing with the death of her mentally ill mother (a paranormal researcher) some months before. As she and her partner, Detective Justice, investigate the murders on the ship, Rita begins having visions about a woman who looks like her, and starts asking questions about her mother's past. Rita is completely unaware of her vampire heritage, and believes she is losing her mind like her mother.

Max initiates a series of sinister methods to pull Rita into his thrall, including seducing and murdering her roommate Nikki, as well as disguising himself as her preacher and a lowlife crook. Max, in these disguises, misleads Rita into thinking Justice slept with Nikki, making her jealous and angry with him. After saving Rita from being run down by a taxicab, Max takes her to dinner. Rita is taken with Max's suave charm, and while dancing with her, he bites her.

The next day, Justice finds Rita in her apartment, having slept all day with it completely darkened. Justice informs Rita about Nikki's murder, and vows to help understand her visions, as one correctly foretold Nikki's fate. Rita forgives Justice, but she almost bites him in the neck during a passionate kiss before catching her disappearing reflection in a mirror, and realizes she is becoming a vampire. She confronts Max about the changes occurring in her, and deduces he is also responsible for the murders she and Justice are investigating. Rita further finds out that Max was sent to her by her father; his death at the hands of vampire hunters was what drove Rita's mother insane.

Max tries to convince Rita that she will be happier as a vampire instead of remaining in the human world, where he feels she will remain out of place and misunderstood by society. Justice plans to rescue Rita from Max, and seeks advice from Dr. Zeko, a vampire expert they visited earlier in the murder investigation. Zeko explains that he knew Rita's mother while she did her research on the vampires of the Caribbean islands, and she surrendered to evil by falling in love with Rita's father. To avoid becoming a vampire, Rita must refrain from drinking the blood of an innocent human victim and Max must die before the next full moon. Zeko gives Justice an ancient dagger with instructions to either kill Max or risk being killed by Rita.

When Justice reaches her, Rita is lying inside Max's coffin, almost completely changed into a vampire, and threatens to bite Justice. Justice and Max fight, during which Justice loses Zeko's dagger on the floor. Max encourages Rita to kill Justice and complete the transformation, but she rejects life as a vampire and drives the dagger through Max's heart, causing him to disintegrate. Rita and Justice kiss.

Meanwhile, Julius, now completely decayed, enters his master's limousine. He finds Max's ring and puts it on, instantly transforming him into a fully intact member of the undead. Overjoyed, he tells Silas, "There's a new vampire in Brooklyn, and his name is Julius Jones!", as both of them drive off into the night to parts unknown.

Cast
 Eddie Murphy as Maximillian / Preacher Pauly / Guido
 Angela Bassett as Detective Rita Veder
 Allen Payne as Detective Justice
 Kadeem Hardison as Julius Jones
 John Witherspoon as Silas Green
 Zakes Mokae as Dr. Zeko
 Joanna Cassidy as Captain Dewey
 W. Earl Brown as Police Officer
 Simbi Khali as Nikki
 Ray Combs as Game Show Host
 John LaMotta as Lizzy

Production
Stunt performer Sonja Davis was fatally injured performing a  backward fall.

According to Charlie Murphy, the movie was originally going to be a straight horror film with no laughs but Wes Craven brought a different focus to it. He also said: "Maximilian wasn't going to have any redeeming qualities. But Wes taught us that we must get the audience to care about our characters. And even if they didn't know any vampires personally, they would at least have to identify with the type of person he was."

About the movie, Eddie Murphy said: "I've always wanted to do something where I was the villain in the movie. I love horror pictures and I was a big fan of Wes Craven. This movie started out as something small, this was a movie my company was just going to produce and the screenplay came together so well that I thought it will be a fun role to play. Because I got to do something kind of scary and had a safety net because the vampire can turn into other peoples. I get to be funny when I'm the preacher and I get to be funny when I'm the Italian guy. And the vampire is pretty straight and I got all these funny stuff happening around me. I felt it was a unique piece to do."

Filming lasted for 55 days, of which three were spent on location in New York City and the rest were spent in Los Angeles.

Reception

Critical response
Vampire in Brooklyn was released to coincide with the Halloween season. The film received mostly negative reviews, and was considered at the time as a lesser film of both Murphy and Craven. In the next year, 1996, Craven moved on to begin the hugely successful Scream franchise, while Murphy began concentrating on more family-friendly movies, with his remake The Nutty Professor. On Rotten Tomatoes the film has an approval rating of 12% based on reviews from 33 critics, and the site's consensus is: "Neither scary nor very funny, this misguided effort never lives up to its premise." On Metacritic, it has score of 27% based on reviews from 17 critics. Audiences polled by CinemaScore gave the film an average grade of "B+" on an A+ to F scale.

Roger Ebert gave the film 1 star out of 4, saying: "The movie is unpleasant to look at. It's darker than Se7en, but without sufficient purpose, and my overall memory of it is people screaming in the shadows. To call this a comedy is a sign of optimism; to call it a comeback for Murphy is a sign of blind faith." Variety wrote, in a positive review, "Helmer Wes Craven keeps the action moving despite some detours allowing Murphy to play other characters as he did in Coming to America. Murphy proves effective and menacing as the vampire in a rather brave departure from what might be expected. Bassett looks great once she gets vampired-up. The vampire effects and makeup are also impressive."

Box office
The film grossed $19.8 million in the United States and Canada and $35 million worldwide against a $14 million budget.

Legacy

Critical reassessment
At the time of its release, Vampire in Brooklyn was seen as one of Murphy and Craven’s lesser films, something Murphy acknowledged in a 2016 interview: “Well, I don’t think the New Yorker will be singing the praises of “Meet Dave.” “That was a gem!” I don’t know if there’s some “Pluto Nash” Appreciation Club out there. The Friends of “Holy Man” Group. The “Vampire in Brooklyn” Club.“
Since then, Vampire In Brooklyn become a cult classic. In the retrospective book Wes Craven: The Art of Horror, the author John Kenneth Muir praised the film especially Murphy and Bassett’s chemistry, the comedy, the special effect sequences, the score and the "overall 1930s–'40s mood“ which he called “charming“. Charles Pulliam More from Gizmodo touted Vampire in Brooklyn as one of the most “underrated horror movies of all time“ and praised it as “one of the most unique films in its genre—and one of the best." Monique Jones from Shadow and Act stated that Vampire in Brooklyn is one of Murphy's most interesting films due to how much of an outlier it is in his filmography." Andrew Shearer from Online Athens singled out the movie as one of Murphy's most underrated performances. Stephanie Williams from SYFY Wire considers the movie a "spooky-time favorite" and praised Bassett's performances, the humor (especially from Hardison and Witherspoon) and adds that "infusing Caribbean culture into the traditional vampire lore was an excellent choice for obvious reasons." Rich Knight from Cinema Bland considers the movie a "underrated classic" and said: “I don't care what anybody says, I love this movie." In 2022, Vampire in Brooklyn was listed among some other “underrated“ vampire movies by Sara Century from Collider who praised Murphy and Bassett’s performances and the humor. On a retrospective article about Wes Craven, Chris Catt from Creepy Catalog praised the movie and considered it as “one of his more underrated movies.“

Angela Bassett’s performance was particularly praised. Danielle Kwateng-Clark from Essence singled out Vampire in Brooklyn as one of the best movies starring Angela Bassett and simply said about it "Every actor plays a cop at least once in their career, and Bassett was great alongside Eddie Murphy in this film." Jake Dee from Screen Rant considers Rita Veder, Angela Bassett's characters, as one of Wes Craven's strongest female characters. Fiona Underhill from Slash Film include Vampire in Brooklyn as one of her best movies at #12: “Vampire in Brooklyn" is a fun horror-comedy, but Bassett's acting is as impressive as ever, even while things around her are so chaotic and a mixture of tones“ Marcus Shorter from Andscape also praised Bassett: “Murphy’s name appears first on the poster, but narratively, Vampire in Brooklyn is Bassett’s movie.“

For its 25th anniversary, Rotten Tomatoes released a podcast titled "Rotten Tomatoes score is wrong about Vampire in Brooklyn" that attempted to justify why "Vampire in Brooklyn" should have received a higher score calling it a "cult classic" especially for the "under-appreciated sense of the bizarre, a killer score, and some serious chemistry between Murphy and Angela Bassett". They also added: "Look closely, and there are glimmers of Craven's keen sense of the horror-comedy mix, and Murphy's natural-born charisma."

The cast and crews thoughts on the film
In an interview with Rolling Stone, Murphy gave a reason Vampire in Brooklyn was a failure: "The only way I was able to do Nutty Professor and to get out of my Paramount deal, I had to do Vampire in Brooklyn. But you know what ruined that movie? The wig. I walked out in that longhaired wig and people said, 'Oh, get the fuck out of here! What the hell is this?'"

Speaking with director Mick Garris for his “Post Mortem“ interviews, Craven reflected than Murphy wanted to show off his dramatic acting chops: “He didn’t want to be funny at all. He wanted to play it totally straight so I couldn’t get the humor into it that I wanted to get into it. But it was an interesting experience.” About the final product, he said: "I thought it was a fun little film and it was nice to get a chance to do comedy but i think the script really hampered it". Craven’s longtime collaborator and fellow producer Marianne Maddalena also shared similar thoughts about what went wrong with the movie: “It was just a strange movie. Strange studio movie with Eddie Murphy not wanted to be funny so that’s already was not a good move“ she added: “It was not the most pleasant experience“.

In 2023, Bassett received the Montecito Award at the Santa Barbara International Film Festival and acknowledged her stunt double’s [Sonja Davis] incredible performance, and how she unfortunately lost her life during the film. Film Festival’s executive director, Roger Durling, singled out Vampire in Brooklyn as one of the most underrated movies on her filmography.

In an interview with The A.V. Club, John Witherspoon stated Vampire in Brooklyn was "one of my favorite movies. I had the chance to holler and scream." Kadeem Hardison also singled out Vampire in Brooklyn as his "favorite" works: “I had so much fun doing this. This was probably the most fun—I'm Gon Git You Sucka was close. Damon Wayans was my comedy guru. But Ed was some kind of Jesus, he was a god.“

Later Co-writer Chris Parker said: "I don't want to disparage Vampire in Brooklyn. I love it. I’m so glad it happened." Co-writer Michael Lucker is happy about the legacy of the film: "What's strange is as the years go by, no matter where I go, there are people who love this movie and know lines from it. I live in Atlanta, and whenever it comes up with people in the community it's met with such a positive response and wide grins."

Later Editor Patrick Lussier said:“There were all sorts of challenges with making that film, including the death of a stunt woman early on in the first week of photography. Her name was Sonia Davis and there was a lot of weight on that film because of it. It was a pretty awful thing and then after that, the combination of Eddie Murphy wanting to make a movie that was completely in the vein of The Serpent and the Rainbow, which is one of Wes's best films, and the studio Paramount wanted them to make essentially a sort of Horror version of Beverly Hills Cop. The original drafts of the script were much darker and much, much more Brooklyn centric and very, very cool. I think the original ending had an oil tanker truck hanging off the side of the Brooklyn Bridge and this sort of fight with Eddie, Angela Bassett and Allen Payne all in is this thing. I remember him telling me one day that the head of the studio at Paramount had dragged him in after seeing some of the dailies and was yelling at him that it needed to be funny. It needed to be funny the way Jack Nicholson was funny in The Shining, when he says, ‘here's Johnny’ and Wes's response was, ‘Do you hear yourself? You're saying this needs to be funny, like The Shining… so I think it was a brutally hard experience for so many reasons.“

See also
 Dracula: Dead and Loving It
 Eddie Murphy filmography
 List of film accidents
 Vampire films

References

External links

 
 
 
 
 

1990s American films
1990s comedy horror films
1990s English-language films
1995 films
1995 comedy films
1995 horror films
African-American comedy horror films
African-American films
American comedy horror films
American vampire films
Films directed by Wes Craven
Films scored by J. Peter Robinson
Films set in Brooklyn
Films set in Los Angeles
Paramount Pictures films
Vampire comedy films